is a district located in Ibaraki Prefecture, Japan.

Population and area
Following the Inashiki merger but as of November 1, 2021 population data, the district has an estimated population of 70,598 and a density of 387 persons per km2. Its total area is 182.31 km2.

Geography
Ami Town and Miho Village are neighboring municipalities, separated about 12 kilometers from the border of Kawachi Town.

Towns and villages
The district currently has 2 towns and 1 village.

Mergers
Predecessor districts: Kōchi (or Kawachi) Distric and Shida District.
 
In 1889 Shida with 1 town and 13 villages, and Kōchi with 1 town and 19 villages. (2 towns and 32 villages)

District creation
The Inashiki District was much larger, originating from the ancient Kōchi and Shida districts.
1896 (Meiji 29)
April 1 Established in most areas of Kōchi District (excluding Onogawa Village) and most of Shida District (excluding Azuma Village and Nakaya Village) due to the enforcement of the county system. (2 towns and 29 villages)

Latest mergers
1996 (Heisei 8)
June 1 Shintone Village enforces the town system and becomes Shintone Town. Kawachi Village enforces the town system and becomes Kawachi Town. (5 towns and 3 villages)
September 1 Azuma Village enforces the town system and becomes Azuma Town. (6 towns and 2 villages)
November 1, 2002 Kukizaki Town was transferred to Tsukuba City. (5 towns and 2 villages)
 On March 22, 2005 the towns of Azuma, Edosaki and Shintone and the village of Sakuragawa merged to form the new city of Inashiki. (2 towns and 1 village)

Gallery

External links
Contents of this article, contains information from the existing Japanese Wikipedia article at 稲敷郡.

Districts in Ibaraki Prefecture